Ozymandias is the name of a musical project by neo-classical Swiss pianist, Christophe Terrettaz.

Biography 
Ozymandias is the pseudonym of the pianist and composer Christophe Terrettaz.

After several years studying classical piano, Christophe Terrettaz starts to compose. His first work, "Isolement", is produced in 1996 by the German label "Weisser Herbst".
 
His second album, "Ahara", is released in 1998 by the cult label World Serpent Distribution.
 
In 1999, Mark Ellis of "Elijah's Mantle" and Christophe Terrettaz collaborates on "The Soul Of Romanticism'" a spoken-word album based on poems of Shelley, Byron, Keats, Wordsworth and Coleridge. This work exposes the elements of romanticism through the voice of Ellis Mark and the music of Ozymandias.
 
The following year Christophe Terrettaz creates "Karnak," a series of compositions inspired by the Egyptian site of same name.
The work is very well received, with Japanese director Ryuichi Hiroki choosing it as the musical theme for his movie "Vibrator", a film presented in avant-premiere to the 60th Mostra of Venice.
 
In September 2001, Ozymandias, through World Serpent Distribution, releases his fifth album "Layla". For this opus, Christophe Terrettaz draws inspiration from a number of films from independent cinema, including "Un soir après la guerre" of Rithy Panh, "Okaeri" of Makoto Shinozaki and "Buffalo 66" of Vincent Gallo.
 
Three years later Ozymandias creates his darkest album yet, "Les Doutes Eternels", a reflection on human condition and genocide.
 
2007 brings yet another opus, "Absolute". This seventh album of Ozymandias is animated by the aspects of the world and its people that Christophe Terrettaz admires.
 
In April 2008, after eight years without concerts, Ozymandias comes back on stage for two shows in Tokyo. Five months later, a new album inspired by his journeys invites you to discover his love for the Orient. The beauty and strength, depth of feelings as well as human folly is the essence of “Les Rêves Orientaux” (Oriental Dreams).

In February 2009, Christophe, invited Kelli Ali to Switzerland, to collaborate with him on an album inspired by the short stories of the Gothic horror writer, Mary Shelley, and following several sessions between London and Switzerland, this haunting collection was eventually completed, with Kelli writing and performing the lyrics and vocal arrangements and Christophe writing and performing the piano music.
"A Paradise Inhabited by Devils" was released in November 2010.
Two titles of this album are used in the Japanese movie “Keibetsu”.

2012 marks the release of his latest album, “Antipodes”. Produced without any promotion in order to be in harmony with the theme of the album which means completely against current market trend today.
"Antipodes" is a reflection on the current world where superficial excess and
money take everything in its path.

"Nos Années Troubles" is realised in October 2014.

April 2017 - Three years after the album "Nos Années Troubles" (Our Troubled Years) and after 15 million plus streams on Spotify for the track "I Miss You"- Ozymandias returns with his new album "Dans Mon Monde" (In My World). Composed with influences from both Asia and Europe, the Swiss pianist's tenth solo album aims to draw you into the world that he experiences!

His thirteenth album, started in February 2018 and released in December 2020 with the title 101 VISAGES (101 FACES), invites you on an inner journey as well as a rare moment of intimacy with the composer.

Discography

Albums
101 Visages  2020
Dans Mon Monde  2017
Nos Années Troubles  2014
Antipodes  2012
A Paradise Inhabited By Devils with Kelli Ali  2010
Les Rêves Orientaux Ramses CD 07 2008
Absolute Ramses CD 06 2007
Les Doutes Eternels (Eternal Doubts) Ramses CD 05 2004
Layla Ramses CD04 2001 World Serpent Distribution
Karnak Ramses CD03 2000 World Serpent Distribution
The Soul of Romanticism with Elijah's Mantle (Da Nova Da Capo DNDC 013 CD)  1999 World Serpent Distribution
Ahara WSCD 018 1998 World Serpent Distribution
Isolement EFACD 12736-2 1996 Weisser Herbst Production

Compilations
Der Seelen Tiefengrund Vol.5 / Angelwings, Zoomshot, 2002-EFA "Comment l'oublier ?"
Cantara 4 /Angelwings,Zoomshot, 2002-EFA " Seul au monde"
Cantara 3 /Angelwings, Zoomshot media entertainment, Köln, 2001, Germany EFA 61611-2, " Premier Pylône"
Cantara / Angelwings, Zoomshot media entertainment, Köln, 1998, Germany EFA 61611-2, "Le départ de Diana R"
Mask of the People, Ramses records CD 01 2000 World Serpent Distribution, unpublished : DE PORT MORESBY A HOSKINS

Soundtracks
IDEA Inc. Tokyo, Japan
A Ryuichi Hiroki film

See also
 Official website
 Video of Ozymandias

Swiss pianists
Swiss male musicians
1971 births
Living people
21st-century pianists
21st-century male musicians